The 1964 Hammersmith Council election took place on 7 May 1964 to elect members of Hammersmith London Borough Council in London, England. The whole council was up for election and the Labour party gained control of the council with almost 63% of the vote.

Background
These elections were the first to the newly formed borough. Previously elections had taken place in the Metropolitan Borough of Hammersmith and Metropolitan Borough of Fulham. These boroughs were joined to form the new London Borough of Hammersmith by the London Government Act 1963.

A total of 134 candidates stood in the election for the 60 seats being contested across 21 wards. These included a full slate from the Conservative and Labour parties, while the Liberals stood 9 candidates. Other candidates included 5 from the Communist party. There were 18 three-seat wards and 3 two-seat wards.

This election had aldermen as well as directly elected councillors.  Labour got 9 aldermen and the Conservatives 1.

The Council was elected in 1964 as a "shadow authority" but did not start operations until 1 April 1965.

Election result
The results saw Labour gain the new council with a majority of 46 after winning 53 of the 60 seats. Overall turnout in the election was 32.0%. This turnout included 696 postal votes.

Ward results

Addison

Avonmore

Broadway

Brook Green

Colehill

College Park & Old Oak

Coningham

Crabtree

Gibbs Green

Grove

Halford

Margravine

Parsons Green

St Stephen's

Sandford

Sherbrooke

Starch Green

Sulivan

Town

White City

Wormholt

References

1964
1964 London Borough council elections
20th century in the London Borough of Hammersmith and Fulham